(stylized as LOVe) is a Japanese manga series written and illustrated by Osamu Ishiwata. It was serialized in Shogakukan's Weekly Shōnen Sunday from August 1993 to February 1999. Its chapters were collected in thirty tankōbon volumes.

Manga
Love is written and illustrated by Osamu Ishiwata, and is the continuation of the story from B.B., an earlier manga of Ishiwata's. Love started in the combined 1993 35th–36th issue of Shogakukan's Weekly Shōnen Sunday on August 18, 1993, and finished in the 1999 10th issue of the magazine on February 17, 1999. The series was collected into thirty tankōbon volumes published by Shogakukan, released from April 18, 1994 to March 18, 1999.

Volume list

References

External links 

Shogakukan manga
Shōnen manga
Tennis in anime and manga